Sandt is a surname. Notable people with this surname include:

Andreas Sandt (born 1962), German footballer
Lewis Earle Sandt (1888–1913), American aviation pioneer
Nina Sandt (1928–2003), German actress
Patty Kazmaier-Sandt (1962–1990), American ice hockey player
Tommy Sandt (1950–2020), American baseball player
Wolfgang Sandt (born 1960), German sculptor and author

See also

Van der Sandt